Skylands is a  estate property located in Ringwood State Park in Ringwood, New Jersey, a borough in Passaic County in the state of New Jersey. The Skylands property is within the Ramapo Mountains and it is maintained by the Skyland Association. The property is marketed with the garden as New Jersey State Botanical Garden at Skylands.

The house and gardens, including formal gardens and specimen plantings, were built in the 1920s by Clarence MacKenzie Lewis, a New York City stockbroker and civil engineer. Lewis hired architect John Russell Pope to design the 44-room Tudor revival manor house. The manor is a reproduction English mansion featuring rectangular, bay and oriel windows. A nine-hole golf course once graced this property.

The estate was added to the National Register of Historic Places on September 28, 1990, for its significance in architecture and landscape architecture.

Garden
In 1966 the entire estate was bought by the State of New Jersey to form a State Botanical Garden whose settings include a Lilac Garden, Magnolia Walk, the Wild Flower Garden, the Crab Apple Vista, an allée of 166 trees extending almost a half-mile, and the Perennial Garden. The entire section now comprises slightly over 4,000 acres (16 km2) of parkland.

The Winter Garden included New Jersey's largest Jeffery pine (Pinus jeffreyi). Its east side features a weeping beech beside a century-old upright beech, as well as a Japanese umbrella pine. Other interesting non-native trees include an Algerian fir (Abies numidica) and Atlas cedar (Cedrus atlantica).

Gallery

See also 

 List of botanical gardens in the United States
 National Register of Historic Places listings in Passaic County, New Jersey

References

External links 
 New Jersey Botanical Garden, Skylands Manor House

Arboreta in New Jersey
Botanical gardens in New Jersey
Houses in Passaic County, New Jersey
Houses on the National Register of Historic Places in New Jersey
Historic house museums in New Jersey
Museums in Passaic County, New Jersey
Tourist attractions in Bergen County, New Jersey
Protected areas of Bergen County, New Jersey
Protected areas of Passaic County, New Jersey
Ringwood, New Jersey
National Register of Historic Places in Passaic County, New Jersey
New Jersey Register of Historic Places